The Gemäldegalerie Alte Meister is an art gallery housed in the Schloss Wilhelmshöhe in Kassel in Germany. It is based on the collection of William VIII, Landgrave of Hesse-Kassel.

Works from the Gallery of the Old Masters

External links 

 Staatliche Museen Kassel
 Material in the Schloss Wilhelmshöhe on the site of the Sammlung Duncker der Zentral- und Landesbibliothek Berlin (PDF; 254 k; 260 kB)

Art museums and galleries in Kassel
Museumslandschaft Hessen Kassel